Bao Shichen (1775—1855) was a calligrapher and reformist scholar in the early nineteenth century. Under the Qing administration, Bao made numerous important suggestions regarding the areas of military affairs, laws and politics, the grain tribute system, the salt monopoly, and the improvement of agricultural practice.

Life 
Bao Shichen grew up in a low-class intellectual family, and had fair education. He was son of a low-ranking Green Standard Army officer, and helped his father to suppress the Lin Shuangwen rebellion. When his father was ill, he brought his father home in Anhui province. While taking care of his father by himself, Bao rented a land to farm, acquiring food this way, and sold vegetables and fruits for money. After his father passed away, Bao used his paternal connections to get a commander position in leading the White Lotus campaigns in the northwest.

Throughout his life, Bao had experienced thirteen failures to pass the highest level of the civil service examination, and therefore did not obtain a formal official position until his late years with the help of friends.

He died in 1855, on the road that flee from Taiping Rebellion.

Bao had one son and one daughter.

His son Bao Cheng published his father's works several times after his death.

Major works and reputation 
Bao Shichen was a leading figure in jinshi--"statecraft" scholarship, an informal movement of Confucians that published tracts on real problems facing 19th century China. His writings owed much to the scholarship of Hong Liangji who had campaigned against the wide-spread corruption under emperor Qianlong. In 1801, Bao wrote an essay Shuochu (说储, On Wealth) to list his ambitious thoughts on the reforms that could help Qing empire to regain its political power and became prosperous again. He believed in the theory of "agriculture first", that agriculture is paramount for achieving prosperity in the country, and he also put down his ideas on agrarian policy in an essay Random notes from the year 1820 (Gengchen zazhu). In 1820s and 1830s, Bao did a considerable amount of work on the reforms of the Grain Tribute Administration and the Liang-Huai Salt Administration.

He advocated large scale institutional reforms, such as getting rid of the Grand Council to improve administrational efficiency, allowing the court to consult the literati, giving farmers low gentry degrees based on their agricultural technique, and reconsolidating the baojia system.

However, Bao's reputation is earned mostly for being a calligrapher and historian of calligraphy. He wrote a book Yizhou Shuangji (艺舟双楫, Two Oars for the Boat of Art) in 1844 on Wei style character formation. Bao was also known in the late Qing to be an anti-foreign patriot and an extreme hardliner in the opium debates and the  first Anglo-Chinese war of 1839-42. In China, Bao Shichen is well-known as an anti-foreign-capitalist advocate. He deeply criticized Opium War and exposed the judicial darkness during the war.

In his late years, Bao collected and compiled all his written works into one book titles Anwu Sizhong (安吴四种, Four Categories of Anwu).

Criticizing Opium Trade 
Bao believed that there were three wastages: tobacco, wine, and opium. Growing luxury crops like grain for distilling alcohol, or tobacco, was - according to Bao - a waste of land, labor and fertilizer that could be better used to grow food. Opium was a different problem in Bao's mind, since it was imported and meant that Chinese wealth was transferred to foreign hands. Therefore, in 1801, he advocated closing down the entire foreign trade and expelling the foreign merchants permanently from Canton.

In Bao's argument on the opium trade, he suggested that large number of silver flowing out of China and the large amount of cash transaction caused the silver money to become more valuable while devaluing the copper money. This directly affected the poorer community and made their life miserable.

References

Further reading 
 

1775 births
1855 deaths
Qing dynasty politicians from Anhui
Qing dynasty essayists
Politicians from Xuancheng
Artists from Anhui
Historians from Anhui
Qing dynasty historians
People from Jing County, Anhui
18th-century Chinese calligraphers
19th-century Chinese calligraphers